Zhang Hui (born 8 October 2000) is a Chinese footballer currently playing as a midfielder for Chinese Super League club Wuhan Three Towns.

Club career
Zhang Hui would play for the Hebei youth team before going on loan to third tier football club Wuhan Three Towns in the 2019 China League Two season. He would have his loan renewed with Wuhan for the following season, which saw the club win the division and promotion to the second tier. On his return to Hebei, he would eventually make his debut for the club on 23 April 2021 against Wuhan in a 1-1 draw. 

On 29 April 2022, it was announced that Zhang would rejoin the now newly-promoted Chinese Super League club Wuhan Three Towns. On his return he would be part of the squad that won the 2022 Chinese Super League title.

Career statistics
.

Honours

Club
Wuhan Three Towns
Chinese Super League: 2022.
China League Two: 2020.

References

External links

2000 births
Living people
Chinese footballers
China youth international footballers
Association football midfielders
China League Two players
Chinese Super League players
Hebei F.C. players